Simon Binham or Bynham was an English chronicler and Benedictine monk of the priory of Binham, Norfolk. He assisted the prior of Binham in opposing the exactions of Hugh, abbot of St. Albans, and was imprisoned for some time with the other rebellious monks. He is said to have contributed to the continuation of the Chronicle of Rishanger, but his other writings are largely lost.

Life 
Simon Binham was probably a native of East Anglia. He became a monk of the Benedictine priory of Binham, Norfolk, one of the cells belonging to the abbey of St. Albans. 

He is first recorded as upholding his prior, William Somerton, in resisting the perceived unjust exactions of Hugh, abbot of St. Albans (1308–1326). The cause of the Binham monks was taken up by the gentry of the neighbourhood, and Sir Robert Walkefare, the patron of the cell, prevailed on Thomas, 2nd Earl of Lancaster, to uphold them. Emboldened by this support, the prior and his monks refused to admit the visitation of the abbot, and the gentlemen of their party garrisoned the priory against him. The abbot, however, appealed to the king, Edward II, who ordered the prior's supporters to return to their homes. Simon and the other rebellious monks were brought to St. Albans and imprisoned. After a while they were released and admitted into the brotherhood, but as a mark of disgrace were sentenced to walk in fetters in all processions of the convent. 

Simon lived to become an influential member of the house, for in the time of Abbot Michael (1336–1349) he was chosen by the chapter as one of the three receivers or treasurers of the collections made for the support of scholars and needy brethren.

Works 
In a notice of the historians of St. Albans, Simon Binham is said to have written after Henry Blankfrount or Blaneforde, and before Richard Savage. The works of Binham and Savage are largely lost, or at least are unidentified. It has, however, been suggested that Binham may have written some of the fragments published in the Rolls edition of the Chronicle of Rishanger.

References

Sources 

 

Attribution:

Further reading 

 Galbraith, V. H., ed. (1937). The St. Albans Chronicle, 1406–1420. Oxford: Clarendon Press. pp. xxvii, xxxv.
 Gransden, Antonia (1982). Historical Writing in England. Vol. 2. Ithaca, NY: Cornell University Press. p. 5.
 Page, William (1906). "8. The Priory of Binham". A History of Norfolk. Vol. 2. (The Victoria History of the Counties of England). London: Archibald Constable and Company Limited. pp. 343–346.
 Riley, Henry Thomas, ed. (1865). Willemi Rishanger … Chronica et Annales, A.D. 1259–1307. (Rolls Series). London: Longman, Green, Longman, Roberts, and Green. pp. 437–499.
 Riley, Henry Thomas, ed. (1867). Gesta Abbatum Monasterii Sancti Albani, a Thoma Walsingham. Vol. 2. (Rolls Series). London: Longmans, Green, Reader, and Dyer. pp. 131, 305.
 Riley, Henry Thomas, ed. (1870). Annales monasterii S. Albani a Johanne Amundesham. Vol. 1. (Rolls Series). London: Longmans, Green, and Co. p. lxvi.
 Riley, Henry Thomas, ed. (1870). Annales monasterii S. Albani a Johanne Amundesham. Vol. 2. (Rolls Series). London: Longman & Co.; Trübner & Co. p. 303.
 Smith, W. J. (1954). "The 'Revolt' of William de Somertone". The English Historical Review, 69(270): pp. 76–83.
 Tanner, Thomas (1748). Bibliotheca Britannico-Hibernica. London: Gulielmus Bowyer. p. 144.

14th-century English clergy
14th-century English writers
English Benedictines